Carbon subsulfide is an organic, sulfur-containing chemical compound with the formula  and structure . This deep red liquid is immiscible with water but soluble in organic solvents. It readily polymerizes at room temperature to form a hard black solid.

Synthesis and structure
C3S2 was discovered by Béla Lengyel, who assigned it an unsymmetrical structure. Later, infrared and Raman spectroscopy showed that the structure is symmetrical with a D∞h point group symmetry, i.e. S=C=C=C=S. This compound is analogous to carbon suboxide whose structure is O=C=C=C=O.

Lengyel first synthesized this compound by passing carbon disulfide (CS2) vapor through an electric arc with carbon electrodes. This treatment produced a black solution that after filtration and evaporation gave a cherry-red liquid. He determined the molecular mass by cryoscopy. Later preparations of C3S2 include thermolysis of a stream of CS2 in a quartz tube heated to 900 to 1100 °C as well as flash vacuum pyrolysis (FVP) of 1,2-dithiole-3-thiones.

Reactions and occurrence
Among its few known reactions, C3S2 reacts with bromine to form the cyclic disulfide.

C3S2 polymerizes under applied pressure to give a black semi-conducting solid. A similar pressure-induced polymerization of CS2 also gives a black semiconducting polymer.

In addition, reactions of C3S2 can yield highly condensed sulfur-containing compounds, e.g. the reaction of C3S2 with 2-aminopyridine.

Using microwave spectroscopy, small CnS2 clusters have been detected in interstellar medium. The rotational transitions of these molecular carbon sulfides matched with the corresponding molecules.

References

Organic compounds
Foul-smelling chemicals